Bolgatanga Central is one of the constituencies represented in the Parliament of Ghana. It elects one Member of Parliament (MP) by the first past the post system of election. The Bolgatanga Central constituency is located in the Bolgatanga Municipal District of the Upper East Region of Ghana.

Boundaries 
The seat is located entirely within the Bolgatanga Municipal District of the Upper East Region of Ghana.

Members of Parliament

See also 

 List of Ghana Parliament constituencies
 List of political parties in Ghana

References 

Parliamentary constituencies in the Upper East Region